Emily Thomas (born 25 February 2001) is a Welsh artistic gymnast. Thomas competed at the 2018 Commonwealth Games where she helped the Welsh team finish in fourth place, and where she also finished sixth in the individual floor exercise final.

Thomas announced her retirement from elite competition on 17 September 2021 where she plans to start a psychology degree course at the Cardiff Metropolitan University.

References

Welsh female artistic gymnasts
Living people
2001 births